Events in the year 2023 in Papua New Guinea.

Incumbents 

 Monarch - Charles III

Federal government 

 Governor-General - Bob Dadae
 Prime Minister - James Marape

Provincial Governors 

 Central: Robert Agarobe
 Chimbu: Micheal Dua Bogai
 East New Britain: Michael Marum
 East Sepik: Allan Bird
 Enga: Peter Ipatas
 Gulf: Chris Haiveta
 Hela: Philip Undialu
 Jikawa: William Tongamp
 Madang: Peter Yama
 Manus: Charlie Benjamin
 Milne Bay: Sir John Luke Crittin, KBE
 Morobe: Ginson Saonu
 New Ireland: Julius Chan
 Oro: Gary Juffa
 Sandaun: Tony Wouwou
 Southern Highlands: William Powl
 West New Britain: Sasindran Muthuvel
 Western: Taboi Awe Yoto
 Western Highlands: Paias Wingti

Events 
 20 February – A Rescue mission begins after a number of foreign citizens and local guides are kidnapped in a remote region of the country.
 22 February – Kidnappers release a woman, whilst negotiations involving an Australian professor, and two others are still underway.

References 

2023 in Papua New Guinea
2020s in Papua New Guinea
2023 in Oceania
Years of the 21st century in Papua New Guinea